Mawphlang Legislative Assembly constituency is one of the 60 Legislative Assembly constituencies of Meghalaya state in India.

It is part of East Khasi Hills district and is reserved for candidates belonging to the Scheduled Tribes.

Members of the Legislative Assembly

Election results

2021 by-election 
This by-election was needed due to the death of sitting MLA, Syntar Klas Sunn of Covid-19, on 10 September 2021. The election, which was carried out on 30 October 2021, was won by his son, Eugeneson Lyngdoh.

2018

See also
 List of constituencies of the Meghalaya Legislative Assembly
 East Khasi Hills district

References

East Khasi Hills district
Assembly constituencies of Meghalaya